Pablo Matéo (born 1 February 2001) is a French sprinter who specializes in the 100 metres. He won a silver medal in the 4×100 m relay at the 2022 European Athletics Championships.

References

External links
 

2001 births
Living people
French male sprinters
People from Évry, Essonne
European Athletics Championships medalists